Multi-Coloured Swap Shop, more commonly known simply as Swap Shop, is a British children's television series that aired on BBC1 from 2 October 1976 to 27 March 1982. It was ground-breaking in many ways: by broadcasting on Saturday mornings, being live, being three hours in length, and using the phone-in format extensively for the first time on TV.

The show rivalled the growing success of rival broadcaster ITV's Tiswas, though the latter was initially only broadcast in the ATV region in the Midlands and, at the time of Multi-Coloured Swap Shops inception, had yet to be taken up by other ITV franchises around the country.

Content
The show was hosted by Noel Edmonds with Keith Chegwin, John Craven and, from 1978, Maggie Philbin.

Also featured was Posh Paws, a stuffed toy dinosaur. Edmonds once explained that his name was actually spelt "Pohs Paws", because that is Swap Shop backwards.

Another person named was "Eric" (Ilett), the often-referred-to but never-seen technician whose job was to lower a plastic globe containing postcards sent in by viewers as answers to competitions.

The content of the programme included music, visits from public figures, competitions, and cartoons. There was also coverage of news and issues relevant to children, presented by John Craven, building on his profile as the presenter of John Craven's Newsround. 

The cornerstone, however, was the "Swaporama" element, hosted by Chegwin, who was very rarely in the studio. An outside broadcast unit would travel to different locations throughout the UK where children could swap their belongings with others. This proved to be one of the most popular aspects of the show, often achieving gatherings of more than 2,000 children.

Generally, the primary purpose of the BBC OB unit was to broadcast a sporting event at that Swaporama venue later that day. This allowed Swap Shop to use the same unit and save programming costs which would otherwise be prohibitive.

Edmonds, Chegwin and Philbin briefly formed a pop group called Brown Sauce in December 1981 and released a single called "I Wanna be a Winner". The song peaked at number 15 in the UK Singles Chart and stayed in the Top 40 for a total of nine weeks.

Telephone number
The telephone number for the show from the second series onward was 01 811 8055. The first series had a different number, 01 288 8055, before being changed to the number retained throughout the rest of the show's run, and retained for its successor, Saturday Superstore.

The number was well known and remembered by children and was groundbreaking for the BBC, who previously had received viewer feedback mainly by letter.

History
Swap Shop was a success, attracting substantial ratings not only among its target audience of children, but also students and parents. It ended in 1982, to allow the presenters to move on to other projects, notably Edmonds, who became one of the highest-profile TV presenters in the UK. It was followed by a sequence of similar programmes over the years, including Saturday Superstore, Going Live! and Live & Kicking.

This first ever question for the live audience was, 'Where will the next Olympic games be held (1980)?'. Moscow was the answer.

Swap Shop is poorly represented in the BBC archive. For some time it was believed that either the programmes were never routinely recorded in the first place, or they had been wiped on the orders of the BBC's Archive Selector Adam Lee in 1993. The truth, as related by ex-Blue Peter editor Richard Marson on the archive television forum The Mausoleum Club in 2006, is that almost every edition of Swap Shop was recorded in full every week onto two 90-minute Quad tapes. These tapes were held by the BBC until the late 1980s, at which time the Deputy Head of Children's Television, Roy Thompson, allowed many of them to be wiped and sold to Australia as recycled stock. Although Quad tape was considered obsolete in the UK, Australia was still using it extensively at that time, and as the Swap Shop tapes had no physical splices in them, they were considered ideal for reuse.

As a consequence of this action, many of the clips used in the retrospective It Started With Swap Shop and as extras on some DVD releases of other BBC shows had to be taken from domestic video recordings that had survived in private hands. Amongst the editions wiped were those featuring appearances by Blondie, XTC, Trumpton creator Gordon Murray, and numerous cast and crew members of Doctor Who.

Noel Edmonds, Keith Chegwin and John Craven reunited in 1999 for a parody of Swap Shop transmitted at the end of the last ever episode of Noel's House Party. In the skit, Edmonds – playing his "younger self" –  wakes up in the Swap Shop studio after supposedly dozing off, and explains to the others that he has just had a horrible dream of him being "trapped in a big house for 8 years", and recounting the events of a typical Noel's House Party episode, and then the three discover that Mr Blobby is also in the studio.

On 20 December 2007, the BBC announced that Swap Shop was returning to BBC Two for a 13-week run. Barney Harwood presented the new show with Basil Brush. The revived show was titled Basil's Swap Shop and lasted for three series.

It Started With Swap Shop
A special programme celebrating the 30th anniversary of BBC children's Saturday morning shows was recorded in December 2006. The show, called It Started With Swap Shop, was made by Noel Edmonds' Unique TV company. Highlights of the programme saw the original presenting team reunited, other presenters from its successor shows Saturday Superstore, Going Live! and Live & Kicking make an appearance and celebrity fans came along to 'make a swap'.

The 130-minute programme was recorded in front of a studio audience at BBC Television Centre on 15 December 2006 and was broadcast on BBC Two on Thursday 28 December 2006 at 9.00pm with a shortened repeat (110 minutes) on Sunday 31 December 2006 at 6.10pm, again on BBC Two. The shortened version of the programme was broadcast on BBC Four on 28 May 2007 at 7.00pm as part of the channel's Children's Television on Trial season.

Other than the original Swap Shop team of Noel Edmonds, John Craven, Keith Chegwin, Maggie Philbin, live appearances were made by Mike Read, Andi Peters, Emma Forbes, Trevor Neal and Simon Hickson. A recorded contribution was made by Phillip Schofield and Sarah Greene. Telephone calls (some prerecorded) were taken from Delia Smith, Dame Edna Everage and Sir Cliff Richard. Other guests included Johnny Ball, Nicki Chapman, Fearne Cotton, Lenny Henry, Arlene Phillips, Chris Moyles and Michael Crawford who appeared on a video link from Australia. A surprise appearance came from Laurence Llewelyn-Bowen as part of Trev and Simon's Draper Brothers sketch.

Annuals

Swap Shop was so popular that during its run 4 annuals were published.

The publishing dates for the books were as follows:
Book 1 – November 1978
Book 2 – September 1979
Book 3 – September 1980
Book 4 – November 1981

The annuals are full of quizzes, funny stories, pop group pictures, knitting patterns plus features on the shows stars.

Each book has presenter photos in which the hosts are seen separately as a comedy character. A memorable example of this is Book 4 which features Noel Edmonds, then in his 30s, as traditional English schoolboy Harry Copter. The character of Harry Copter is referenced throughout the annual, following a humorous split screen interview by Noel on the programme. The fictional character's name is a pun on the host's love of helicopters. This comedic picture of Noel has now made Book 4 extremely collectable.

Transmissions

Out of the 146 episodes that were made in total, 41 survive. These are Episode 21 of Series 1, Episodes 4–5 & 21 of Series 2, Episode 24 of Series 3, Episodes 1–2, 7, 12, 15, 17, 21 & 25 of Series 4, Episodes 1–2, 12, 14–18, 21, 23, 25 & 27 of Series 5 and Episodes 1, 3, 5–7, 11, 13, 15–17, 19–22, & 24–25 of Series 6.

Due to industrial action by the ABS union at the BBC over Thursday 21 and Friday 22 December 1978, the edition which should have aired on Saturday 23 December 1978 was not transmitted.  The reason being that the strike was only settled between the union and the BBC at 10.00pm on Friday 22 December 1978, and it was impossible for the live Swap Shop to be up and running in time for the 9.30am start that next day.  Instead BBC One returned to the air after being blacked out for two full days, at 3.00pm on Saturday 23 December 1978. Swap Shop finally returned on Saturday 30 December 1978.

References

External links

Swap Shop at Saturday Mornings
Swap Shop on Paul Morris' SatKids

BBC children's television shows
1970s British children's television series
1980s British children's television series
1976 British television series debuts
1982 British television series endings
Lost BBC episodes
English-language television shows